The 1963 National League was the 29th season and the eighteenth post-war season of the highest tier of motorcycle speedway in Great Britain.

Summary
The seven entrants were the same as those that had finished the previous season and matches were ridden home and away twice. Belle Vue Aces won their first title in 27 years.

Belle Vue's successful season was soured by a tragedy and the speedway world was in shock when the double world champion Peter Craven died following a challenge match at Edinburgh's Old Meadowbank stadium, on 20 September 1963. Just six days after he lost world crown, Craven swerved to avoid hitting fallen race leader George Hunter and hit the safety fence. Craven was rushed to the Royal Infirmary of Edinburgh, where he died on 24 September.

Final table

Top Ten Riders 
The top ten riders are listed by their points average and only applies to the league.

National Trophy
The 1963 National Trophy was the 25th edition of the Knockout Cup. Norwich were the winners.

First round

Semi-finals

Final

First leg

Second leg

Norwich were National Trophy Champions, winning on aggregate 90–78.

See also
 List of United Kingdom Speedway League Champions
 Knockout Cup (speedway)

References

Speedway National League
1963 in speedway
1963 in British motorsport